Vialky (Russian: Вяльки, V'al'ki) is a village in Pochepsky District of Bryansk Oblast, near the federal route M13 (Bryansk — Novozybkov — state border with Belarus). Vialky is situated on the Nemolodva river, about 95 km away from Bryansk, 10 km from Pochep, Bryansk Oblast. The population is 87 people (2002). Vialky has Nemolodva railway station.

Gallery

References

External links
Vialky official site
Vialky Youtube channel

Rural localities in Pochepsky District